Salbertrand is a comune (municipality) in the Metropolitan City of Turin in the Italian region Piedmont, about 60 km west of Turin. At 31 December 2004 it had a population of 522 and an area of 40.9 km². It has a railway station on the Turin-Modane railway.

Salbertrand borders the following municipalities: Exilles, Oulx and Pragelato.

Population history

References

External links
 www.comune.salbertrand.to.it/

Cities and towns in Piedmont